Fintan Kennedy (died 24 March 1984) was an Irish trade unionist.

The son of Thomas Kennedy, a prominent trade unionist, Kennedy joined the Irish Transport and General Workers' Union in 1934, rising to serve as General Secretary of the union from 1959, then as General President from 1969.  During his secretaryship, membership of the union grew steadily.

In 1966, Kennedy served as President of the Irish Congress of Trade Unions, while he served as Treasurer from 1968.  He was elected to the Labour Panel of the Seanad Éireann in 1969 and representing the Labour Party. He retired from all his positions in the labour movement in 1981.

References

Year of birth missing
1984 deaths
Irish trade unionists
Labour Party (Ireland) senators
Members of the 12th Seanad
Members of the 13th Seanad
Members of the 14th Seanad
Presidents of the Irish Congress of Trade Unions